Rishi Reddi is an American author. She is a L. L. Winship/PEN New England Award laureate.

Biography
Rishi Reddi was born in Hyderabad, India. She grew up in the United Kingdom and the United States.

She is a graduate of Swarthmore College, where she studied English, and the Northeastern University School of Law. In 2001, she earned a master's degree in creative writing from Boston University. Alongside her writing career, she has been an enforcement attorney for the state and federal environmental protection agencies, as well as a lawyer for the Massachusetts Secretary of Environment.

She lives in Cambridge, Massachusetts.

Awards and honors
Her book Karma and Other Stories received the 2008 L. L. Winship/PEN New England Award.  Rishi Reddi's work was chosen for Best American Short Stories 2005, featured on National Public Radio's "Selected Shorts" program, and received an honorable mention for 2004 Pushcart Prize.  She has been a Fellow at the Bread Loaf Writers' Conference and the MacDowell Colony and a recipient of an Individual Artist's Grant from the Massachusetts Cultural Council.

References

External links
 Reddi's website
 Interview in Nirali magazine 
 Meet the Newest Indian literary star Rediff - January 3, 2006
 Rishi Reddi talks about growing up bicultural in the US, from the web-only interview series, WGBH One Guest

Writers from Brookline, Massachusetts
Indian emigrants to the United States
Swarthmore College alumni
Northeastern University School of Law alumni
Year of birth missing (living people)
Living people
Boston University College of Arts and Sciences alumni
Writers from Hyderabad, India
American women writers of Indian descent
21st-century American women writers
21st-century American short story writers
21st-century Indian short story writers
People from Cambridge, Massachusetts